Fathabad-e Yazdanabad (also Romanized as Fatḩābād-e Yazdānābād; also known as Fatḩābād) is a village in Yazdanabad Rural District, Yazdanabad District, Zarand County, Kerman Province, Iran. At the 2006 census, its population was 988, in 226 families.

References 

Populated places in Zarand County